HMS Dover Prize was a 32-gun fifth rate of the Royal Navy.

She was previously the French frigate La Legere, carrying between 20 and 24 guns. She was then refitted with 32 guns, and remained in the Navy until 1698, when she was sold.

References

External links
A model of French frigate LA LEGERE built in 1682 made by Alexander Dobrenko, Russia

Frigates of the Royal Navy